Don't Close Your Eyes is the second studio album by American country music artist Keith Whitley and the last to be released during his lifetime. The album was released on May 31, 1988, by RCA Records. After the success of his debut album, L.A. to Miami (1985), Whitley re-entered the studio and began recording a second album with producer Blake Mevis. After its completion, Whitley was unhappy with its production, and he convinced his label to shelve the recordings. Don't Close Your Eyes was subsequently recorded with producer Garth Fundis. The album's liner notes credit Fundis and Whitley with production on all tracks except "Some Old Side Road" and "Would These Arms Be in Your Way", which are credited to Mevis.

The album became a commercial success, and was certified gold by the Recording Industry Association of America. It contained three consecutive number one hits on the Hot Country Singles chart: "Don't Close Your Eyes", "When You Say Nothing at All", and "I'm No Stranger to the Rain".

Track listing

AOmitted from LP and cassette versions.

Personnel
Compiled from liner notes.

All tracks except "Some Old Side Road" and "Would These Arms Be in Your Way"

Musicians
 Eddie Bayers — drums
 Paul Franklin — steel guitar, Pedabro
 Allen Frizzell — background vocals on "I Never Go Around Mirrors"
 Garth Fundis — background vocals
 Red Lane — acoustic guitar
 Mac McAnally — acoustic guitar
 Dave Pomeroy — bass guitar
 Matt Rollings — piano
 Billy Sanford — acoustic guitar, electric guitar
 Keith Whitley — lead vocals
 Dennis Wilson — background vocals

Technical
 Garth Fundis — production, mixing
 Carlos Grier — mastering assistant
 Gary Laney — engineering, mixing
 Denny Purcell — mastering
 Todd Sholar — assistant engineer
 Keith Whitley — production

"Some Old Side Road" and "Would These Arms Be in Your Way"

Musicians
 Sonny Garrish — steel guitar
 Vern Gosdin — background vocals on "Would These Arms Be in Your Way"
 Rob Hajacos — fiddle on "Would These Arms Be in Your Way"
 Emmylou Harris — background vocals on "Would These Arms Be in Your Way"
 Mitch Humphries — keyboards
 Jerry Kroon — drums
 Mike Lawler — synthesizer
 Larry Paxton — bass guitar
 Brent Rowan — acoustic guitar, electric guitar
 Keith Whitley — lead vocals
 Dennis Wilson — background vocals on "Some Old Side Road"
 Curtis "Mr. Harmony" Young — background vocals on "Some Old Side Road"

Technical
 Bill Harris — engineering
 Blake Mevis — production

Chart performance

Weekly charts

Year-end charts

Singles

Certifications

Production
Produced by Garth Fundis and Keith Whitley except for tracks 6 and 7, produced by Blake Mevis for Southwind Music, Inc.
Engineered By Bill Harris, Gary Laney & Todd Sholar
Mixed By Garth Fundis & Gary Laney
Digital Editing By Carlos Grier
Mastered By Denny Purcell

References

Keith Whitley albums
1988 albums
RCA Records albums
Albums produced by Garth Fundis